Hamidullah Khan is a citizen of Pakistan who was held by the United States in its Bagram Theater Internment Facility in Afghanistan.
United Kingdom human rights group Reprieve reports he was just fourteen years old, when he was picked up in Pakistan.

Daniel Morgan, writing for Newsweek Pakistan, reported that Hamidullah's family received a letter from him in 2010, where he said he had been cleared for release by a Bagram enemy combatant review.

Human rights workers were able to initiate a court inquiry in Lahore for Hamidullah and six other Pakistani men.  
The Pakistani government was ordered to send officials to interview the men.

Khan and five other men were transferred from Bagram on December 5, 2013.  According to Al Jazeera quoted Khan's account of what American officials told him when they released him: "We're sorry, he recalled. We could not establish any link [between] you [and] bad guys."

References

1995 births
Living people
Bagram Theater Internment Facility detainees
Pakistani extrajudicial prisoners of the United States